The International Convention on Maritime Search and Rescue (SAR Convention) is a maritime safety convention of the International Maritime Organization. It entered into force on 22 June 1985. The convention forms part of the legal framework covering Search and rescue at sea.

The SAR Convention was adopted on 27 April 1979. It entered into force on 22 June 1985.

The Convention has been amended by IMO resolutions MSC.70(69) and MSC.155(78). These respective amendments occurred in 1998 and in 2004 respectively.

Content

The SAR Convention covers coordinated Search and rescue at sea, including the organisation of Air-sea rescue services. The aim of the convention was to ensure agreed, standardised procedures for SAR around the world.

It establishes SAR regions (SARR) to allow coastal States to coordinate SAR provision. This includes the establishment of 13 distinct SAR areas of the world's oceans.

It also sets out the establishment of Rescue coordination centres around the world to control SAR operations.

Ratification
As of October 2022, 114 countries were party to the Convention.

References

Maritime safety
International Maritime Organization
1979 in West Germany
Treaties concluded in 1979
Treaties entered into force in 1985
International Maritime Organization treaties
Treaties of Albania
Treaties of Algeria
Treaties of Angola
Treaties of Antigua and Barbuda
Treaties of Argentina
Treaties of Australia
Treaties of Bangladesh
Treaties of Barbados
Treaties of Belgium
Treaties of Brazil
Treaties of Bulgaria
Treaties of Cameroon
Treaties of Canada
Treaties of Cape Verde
Treaties of Chile
Treaties of the People's Republic of China
Treaties of Colombia
Treaties of the Republic of the Congo
Treaties of the Cook Islands
Treaties of Ivory Coast
Treaties of Croatia
Treaties of Cuba
Treaties of Cyprus
Treaties of Denmark
Treaties of Dominica
Treaties of Ecuador
Treaties of Estonia
Treaties of Finland
Treaties of France
Treaties of the Gambia
Treaties of Georgia (country)
Treaties of West Germany
Treaties of East Germany
Treaties of Ghana
Treaties of Greece
Treaties of Honduras
Treaties of Hungary
Treaties of Iceland
Treaties of India
Treaties of Indonesia
Treaties of Iran
Treaties of Ireland
Treaties of Italy
Treaties of Jamaica
Treaties of Japan
Treaties of Jordan
Treaties of Kenya
Treaties of Kiribati
Treaties of Latvia
Treaties of Lebanon
Treaties of Liberia
Treaties of the Libyan Arab Jamahiriya
Treaties of Lithuania
Treaties of Luxembourg
Treaties of Malta
Treaties of Mauritius
Treaties of Mexico
Treaties of Monaco
Treaties of Montenegro
Treaties of Morocco
Treaties of Mozambique
Treaties of Namibia
Treaties of the Netherlands
Treaties of New Zealand
Treaties of Nigeria
Treaties of Niue
Treaties of Norway
Treaties of Oman
Treaties of Pakistan
Treaties of Palau
Treaties of Panama
Treaties of Papua New Guinea
Treaties of Peru
Treaties of the Polish People's Republic
Treaties of Portugal
Treaties of Qatar
Treaties of South Korea
Treaties of Romania
Treaties of the Soviet Union
Treaties of Saint Kitts and Nevis
Treaties of Saint Lucia
Treaties of Samoa
Treaties of Saudi Arabia
Treaties of Senegal
Treaties of Serbia and Montenegro
Treaties of Seychelles
Treaties of Singapore
Treaties of Slovenia
Treaties of South Africa
Treaties of Spain
Treaties of Sweden
Treaties of Syria
Treaties of Togo
Treaties of Tonga
Treaties of Trinidad and Tobago
Treaties of Tunisia
Treaties of Turkey
Treaties of Ukraine
Treaties of the United Arab Emirates
Treaties of the United Kingdom
Treaties of Tanzania
Treaties of the United States
Treaties of Uruguay
Treaties of Vanuatu
Treaties of Venezuela
Treaties of Vietnam
Treaties extended to the Faroe Islands
Treaties extended to Greenland
Treaties extended to Macau
Treaties extended to the Cook Islands
Treaties extended to Niue
Treaties extended to Saint Christopher-Nevis-Anguilla
Treaties extended to Jersey
Treaties extended to Guernsey
Treaties extended to British Honduras
Treaties extended to Bermuda
Treaties extended to the British Virgin Islands
Treaties extended to Gibraltar
Treaties extended to British Hong Kong
Treaties extended to the Isle of Man